Swamp music may refer to:

Swamp rock
Swamp blues
Swamp pop
 "Swamp Music", a track from the 1974 album Second Helping by Lynyrd Skynyrd
 "Swamp Music", an electronic music label and publisher based in the United States